Lautenbach is a German name originally meaning "loud stream". It may refer to:

Rivers
Lautenbach (Linzer Aach), a river of Baden-Württemberg, Germany, tributary of the Linzer Aach
Lautenbach (Ablach), a river of Baden-Württemberg, Germany, tributary of the Ablach

Places
Lautenbach (Ortenaukreis), a municipality in the district Ortenau (Ortenaukreis), Baden-Württemberg, Germany
Lautenbach, Haut-Rhin, a commune in the administrative region Grand Est, France
Lautenbach (Gernsbach), a village incorporated into Gernsbach in Baden-Württemberg, Germany

People
Manegold of Lautenbach (c. 1030–c. 1103), religious and polemical writer and Augustinian canon from Alsace
Wilhelm Lautenbach (1891–1948), German official at the Economics Ministry at the beginning of the 1920s
Walt Lautenbach (1922–1997), American National Basketball Association player

See also
 Laudenbach (disambiguation)
 Lauterbach (disambiguation)